Ko Mark No Mark is a 2014 Sri Lankan Sinhala comedy film directed by Jayaprakash Siwgurunadan and produced by Soma Edirisinghe for EAP Films. It stars Vijaya Nandasiri in dual roles and Dilhani Ekanayake in lead roles along with Giriraj Kaushalya and Mihira Sirithilaka. Music co-composed by Mahesh Denipitiya and Kapila Pugalarachehi. It is the 1217th Sri Lankan film in the Sinhala cinema.

Plot
The film revolves around Mark who works as an assistant to professor Amaraweera a scientist who is working on a new discovery. Mark has a tough time at home with his wife as he has not been paid his salary for several months. She often quarrels with him over this.

One day when Prof. Amaraweera refuse to pay his salary, Mark decides to commit suicide and swallows a solution in the lab prepared by the professor. Instead of death it makes him disappear physically and quite surprisingly he gets in touch with a dead revolutionary Vimukthi. The revolutionary uses Mark to achieve his mission to make a better and equal society. But Mark with Prof. Amaraweera tries to regain his original status.

Cast
 Vijaya Nandasiri as Mark / Minister Meril Palutupana
 Dilhani Ekanayake as Rupika Mihirani
 Mahendra Perera as Professor Amaraweera
 Giriraj Kaushalya as Vimukthi
 Mihira Sirithilaka as Lekamthuma
 Semini Iddamalgoda as Mrs. Palatupana
 Gihan Fernando as Louvie
 Kumara Thirimadura as Mark's neighbour
 Sarath Kothalawala as PM Gangodawila
 Piyumi Boteju as Taniya
 Chinthaka Peiris as Political show host
 Ramya Wanigasekara as Rupika's mother
 Lalith Janakantha as Manager Swami
 Nuwangi Liyange as  Mark's neighbor's wife
 Dimuthu Chinthaka as Mudalali

Soundtrack

References

2014 films
2010s Sinhala-language films